The 2009 Jacksonville Jaguars season was the franchise's 15th season in the National Football League and the 7th under head coach Jack Del Rio. This was the first season for new general manager Gene Smith, who hoped to usher in a "rebuilding" era for the Jaguars franchise. The Jaguars improved upon their 5–11 record in 2008, however, they failed to qualify to play in the playoffs.

The team unveiled a new uniform design for the 2009 season. Team owner Wayne Weaver reportedly wanted to "clean up" the look, feeling that the team had too many uniform styles.

Draft

Staff

Final roster

Local television blackouts 
In 2009, the Jaguars had seven of their eight regular season home games blacked out on local TV. Due to an NFL rule, in order for a home game to be televised in a team's market, all non-premium tickets must be sold within 72 hours of kickoff. Many factors lead to a decrease in ticket sales for the Jaguars, including Jacksonville being a small market, a bad local economy, and low expectations for the team coming into the season. The Jaguars drew attendances under 50,000 in their first six home games. The only game that was televised in the Jacksonville market in 2009 was the final home game of the season when the Jaguars played the Indianapolis Colts on Thursday Night Football. Through the 2021 season, the Jaguars have not had any games blacked out since.

Schedule

Preseason

Regular season

Note: Intra-division opponents are in bold text.

Standings

Game summaries

Week 1: at Indianapolis Colts

Week 2: vs. Arizona Cardinals

Week 3: at Houston Texans

Week 4: vs. Tennessee Titans

Week 5: at Seattle Seahawks

Week 6: vs. St. Louis Rams

Week 7: Bye week

Week 8: at Tennessee Titans

Week 9: vs. Kansas City Chiefs

Week 10: at New York Jets

Week 11: vs. Buffalo Bills

Week 12: at San Francisco 49ers

Week 13: vs. Houston Texans

Week 14: vs. Miami Dolphins

Week 15: vs. Indianapolis Colts

Week 16: at New England Patriots

Week 17: at Cleveland Browns

References

External links
Team schedule on NFL.com
2009 Jacksonville Jaguars season at Pro Football Reference
2009 Jacksonville Jaguars season at ESPN

Jacksonville
Jacksonville Jaguars seasons
Jackson